Lac La Martre, is the third largest lake in the Northwest Territories, Canada. The Tłı̨chǫ community of Whatì (formerly called Lac La Martre) is located on the east shore of Lac La Martre.

Fauna
The lake is located on a main north/south bird migration route. Hundreds of thousands of ducks, geese and other migratory bird species gather to feed in the marshes.

Demographics
Whatì, a small First Nations community with a population of 470, is located on the shores of the lake.

See also

List of lakes of Canada
List of lakes in the Northwest Territories

References

Lakes of the Northwest Territories
Kettle lakes in Canada